The Mbugu people, also known as the Va'maa, Ma'a (Wambugu in Swahili) are an ethnic and linguistic group hailing from western Usambara Mountains of Lushoto District in Tanga Region of Tanzania. Tanzania's Mbugu (or Ma'á) language is one of the few true hybrid languages, combining Bantu grammar with Cushitic lexicon. In actuality, the people speak two languages: one mixed and the other Pare, which is closely linked to the Bantu language. They are estimated to be around 60,000 Mbugu people left.

References

Ethnic groups in Tanzania